The Faro Pentatuch is the first printed book published in Portugal, printed in 1487.

It was printed in Hebrew, and published by a Jew, Samuel Gacon in Faro, in southern Portugal, after he had fled from the Spanish Inquisition.

The only surviving copy is in the British Library in London.

See also
 Hebrew incunabula

References

Incunabula